Isabelle Doucet (born 25 October 1973) is a Canadian speed skater. She competed in the women's 1500 metres at the 1998 Winter Olympics.

References

External links
 

1973 births
Living people
Canadian female speed skaters
Olympic speed skaters of Canada
People from Sainte-Foy, Quebec City
Speed skaters at the 1998 Winter Olympics
Speed skaters from Quebec City
20th-century Canadian women